This is a list of surviving examples of mass-produced aircraft, specifically those that are notable solely or primarily for still existing. To illustrate, the Enola Gay is excluded from this list, but included in List of individual aircraft because it dropped the first atomic bomb.

Note: Period indicates when the aircraft was/is in flyable condition.

See also

 List of surviving Avro Lancasters
 List of surviving Avro Vulcans
 List of displayed Bell AH-1 Cobras
 List of displayed Bell UH-1 Iroquois
 List of surviving Blackburn Buccaneers
 List of surviving Boeing B-17 Flying Fortresses
 List of surviving Boeing B-29 Superfortresses
 List of surviving Boeing B-47 Stratojets
 List of displayed Boeing B-52 Stratofortresses
 List of surviving Cessna T-37 Tweets
 List of surviving Consolidated B-24 Liberators
 List of surviving Consolidated PBY Catalinas
 List of surviving Curtiss P-40s
 List of surviving Curtiss C-46 Commandos
 List of surviving de Havilland Mosquitos
 List of surviving Douglas A-1 Skyraiders
 List of preserved Douglas A-4 Skyhawks
 List of surviving Douglas A-20 Havocs
 List of surviving Douglas A-26 Invaders
 List of surviving Focke-Wulf Fw 190s
 List of surviving Fokker D.VIIs
 List of surviving Folland Gnats
 List of surviving Gloster Meteors
 List of surviving Grumman F4F Wildcats
 List of displayed Grumman S-2 Trackers
 List of surviving Grumman TBF Avengers
 List of surviving Hawker Hurricanes
 List of airworthy Ju 52s
 List of surviving Lockheed F-104 Starfighters
 List of surviving Lockheed P-38 Lightnings
 List of surviving McDonnell F-101 Voodoos
 McDonnell Douglas F-4 Phantom IIs on display
 List of surviving Messerschmitt Bf 109s
 List of surviving North American B-25 Mitchells
 List of surviving North American P-51 Mustangs
 List of surviving Republic F-105 Thunderchiefs
 List of surviving Republic P-47 Thunderbolts
 List of surviving Saab 35 Drakens
 List of surviving Sabre aircraft
 List of surviving Sikorsky CH-54s
 List of surviving Supermarine Spitfires
 List of surviving Vought F4U Corsairs

Lists of aircraft